St. Paul's Hill is a hill in Malacca City, Malacca, Malaysia. It was originally known as the Malacca Hill during the Malacca Sultanate period and Mary's Hill during the Portuguese Malacca period.

Features

Gallery

See also
 Geography of Malaysia
 List of tourist attractions in Malacca

References

Geography of Malacca